Bernegg Castle may refer to:

Bernegg Castle, Graubünden, Switzerland
Bernegg Castle, Thurgau, Switzerland